2012 Isle of Man TT were held between Saturday 26 May and Saturday 9 June 2012 on the 37.73-mile Isle of Man TT Mountain Course. The 2012 Isle of Man TT Festival also included the Pre-TT Classic Races on 25, 26 & 28 May 2012 and the Post-TT Races on 9 June 2012 and both events held on the Billown Circuit.

After winning the first event of the 2012 Isle of Man TT the Superbike TT race, the works Honda rider John McGuinness later in the week won for the first time the 1000cc Superstock TT race to raise his tally to nineteen Isle of Man TT wins and the Joey Dunlop TT Championship by 74 points from Bruce Anstey and Cameron Donald in third place. After a year's sabbatical, the Isle of Man sidecar TT competitor Dave Molyneux returned to racing at the Isle of Man TT to win both Sidecar TT Races 1 & 2 in convincing style. The New Zealander, Bruce Anstey repeated his 2011 success and again won the 600cc Supersport TT Race 1.  After retiring from the lead of Supersport TT Race 1 on lap 3, the second Supersport TT Race was won by Michael Dunlop after the race was delayed by problems with weather on the Snaefell Mountain Course. The third running of the TT Zero was again won by Michael Rutter riding the electric powered MotoCzysz motor-cycle and also breaking the prestigious 100 mph barrier with a lap at an average race speed of 104.056 mph.  The Blue Riband event of the 2012 TT Race week the Senior TT was held over to the next day due to heavy rain and low cloud on the TT Mountain Course.  The rescheduled Senior TT race was later cancelled for the first time in the history of the event due to further problems with low cloud and rain showers on the section of the TT Course from the Mountain Mile to the 32nd Milestone.  The last race of the 2012 Isle of Man TT Races, the Lightweight TT making a return to the race programme for 650cc Supertwin motor-cycles and after being reduced in length produced an inaugural win for Ryan Farquhar in the new class.

Results

Practice Times

Practice Times & Leaderboard Superbike/Senior TT
Plates; Black on White/Black on Yellow.

Practice Times & Leaderboard Superstock TT
Plates; Red.

Practice Times & Leaderboard Supersport Junior TT
Plates; Blue.

Practice Times & Leaderboard Lightweight TT
Race Plates; Green.

Practice Times and Leaderboard 600cc Sidecar TT

Race results

2012 Superbike TT final standings.
2 June 2012 6 Laps (236.38 Miles) TT Mountain Course.

Fastest Lap: John McGuinness – 130.483 mph (17' 20.97) on lap 1.

2012 Sidecar TT Race 1 TT final standings
2 June 2012 3 Laps (113.00 Miles) TT Mountain Course.

Fastest Lap: Dave Molyneux/Patrick Farrance – 113.590 mph (19' 55.77) on lap 3.

2012 Supersport Junior TT Race 1
4 June 2012 4 Laps (150.73 Miles) TT Mountain Course.

Fastest Lap: Michael Dunlop – 126.948 mph (17' 49.95) on lap 2.

2012 Superstock TT Race final standings.
4 June 2012 4 Laps (150.73 Miles) TT Mountain Course.

Fastest Lap: Michael Dunlop – 129.253 mph (17' 30.87) on lap 4.

2012 TT Zero Race
6 June 2012 1 Lap (37.73 Miles) TT Mountain Course.

 (9 Starters)

Fastest Lap and New Race Record: Michael Rutter – 104.056 mph (22' 23.97) on lap 1.

2012 Sidecar TT Race 2 TT final standings
6 June 2012 3 Laps (113.00 Miles) TT Mountain Course.

Fastest Lap: Dave Molyneux/Patrick Farrance – 114.486 mph (19' 46.42) on lap 3.

2012 Supersport Junior TT Race 2
6 June 2012 4 Laps (150.73 Miles) TT Mountain Course.

Fastest Lap: Michael Dunlop – 125.629 mph (18' 01.19) on lap 4.

2012 Supersport Lightweight TT
9 June 2012 3 Laps (113.00 Miles) * Reduced Race Distance - TT Mountain Course.

Fastest Lap: Michael Rutter – 115.554 mph (19' 35.45) on lap 3.

See also
 Manx Grand Prix
 North West 200
 Ulster Grand Prix

Gallery

Sources

External links

 2012 Isle of Man TT Races Circuit Guide

Isle of Man TT
2012 in British motorsport
2012
2012 in motorcycle sport